Bubis is a surname. Notable people with the surname include:

Ignatz Bubis (1927–1999), German Jewish leader
Isaak Bubis (1910—2000), Moldavian Soviet engineer and architect